Erbessa salvini is a moth of the family Notodontidae first described by Cajetan and Rudolf Felder in 1874. It is found in Guatemala, Nicaragua, Costa Rica and Panama.

The larvae feed on Henriettea tuberculosa.

References

Moths described in 1874
Notodontidae